Blatnick is a surname. Notable people with the surname include:

Jamie Blatnick (born 1989), American football player
Jeff Blatnick (1957–2012), American super heavyweight Greco-Roman wrestler and sports commentator

See also
Blatnik